Love Don't Cost a Thing (stylized as Love Don't Co$t a Thing) is a 2003 American teen comedy film written and directed by Troy Beyer and starring Nick Cannon and Christina Milian. It also stars Steve Harvey, Kenan Thompson, and Kal Penn. The film is a remake of the 1987 film Can't Buy Me Love and takes its title from the Jennifer Lopez song of the same name, but the main cast are actors of color instead of white. The remake was not produced by Disney (which the original was produced by its division).

Plot 

Alvin Johnson (Nick Cannon) is an extremely intelligent nerd who skilled in designing car engines. He has also taken up a job as a pool cleaner, to raise money to buy a camshaft, a part needed to build an engine for a scholarship project that will ensure him a full ride to the school of his choice. Alvin has always dreamed of hanging out with the popular kids, especially Paris Morgan (Christina Milian), an attractive, popular cheerleader dating NBA star Dru Hilton. When Paris crashes her mother's Escalade during an argument with Dru, Alvin agrees to repair the car using the money he had earned for his project, jeopardizing his scholarship opportunity, after a few missteps, Paris eventually pays him back by giving him a $1,500 makeover and agreeing to pretend for two weeks that she's dating Alvin.

Alvin then begins to ingratiate himself with the popular crowd. He and Paris grow closer as she shares with him her secret love of music and he shares with her that he knows how to build car engines. Paris begins to develop feelings for Alvin and at the end of their two-week dating period, she tries to hint that she would like to kiss him. However, Alvin misinterprets her and goes along with their initial plan of a public break up at school.

Even after the break up, Alvin continues to grow in popularity, estranging his former nerdy friends and flirting with Paris's friends. Paris is unhappy to realize how shallow and vapid her friends are, and by extension, Alvin. Tired of him constantly ditching them in favor of the popular kids, Alvin's friends confront him on the matter, during which Alvin's sister Aretha overhears. She comes to realize that Alvin paid Paris to date her seeing how he has nothing of value after his big makeover. She tells their parents, who attempt to talk to Alvin, but he blows them off.

At the end of the year on Senior Ditch Day, Paris asks Alvin to hang out as real friends, but a newly-egotistical Alvin insults her. They argue and storm off from each other. Dru is also at the party to meet up with Paris, but breaks up with her when he finds out she had been "dating" Alvin. In an attempt to win Dru back, Paris reveals the truth about her and Alvin to the whole school, and Alvin is immediately ostracized. While changing to not being popular, Alvin finally realizes he never had the camshaft for his project.

Alvin's father Clarence pays for the camshaft, telling Alvin that they will work out a plan later to pay him back while also explaining to Alvin that he'd supported his sudden transformation because he wanted Alvin to have the same experiences he did while he was in high school, seeing as he was one of the most popular guys at his school. He also admits that he didn't have Alvin's brains nor potential, but he's always been proud of his son. With this confidence restored, Alvin builds an engine with the part his father bought. Alvin's friends push the broken car they had been working on into the garage. They congratulate him on a job well done on completing the engine but are still angry with him for blowing them off. Alvin sees that their car needs a new engine so he installs the one he just built to restore their car, telling them to let him have it sometime within that next week so he can present it to the scholarship committee. Alvin's friends forgive him.

Together, they all attend a school basketball game where Alvin stands up for his nerdy friends against the basketball players. Alvin finally redeems himself in front of everyone and his friends become friendly with the popular crowd. Alvin leaves the gymnasium, and as Paris follows him out, she is stopped by Dru. Paris blows him off and chases after Alvin. They finally kiss and agree to begin a real relationship.

Cast
 Nick Cannon as Alvin "Al" Johnson
 Christina Milian as Paris Morgan
 Steve Harvey as Clarence Johnson (father of Alvin)
 Vanessa Bell Calloway as Vivian Johnson (mother of Alvin)
 Ashley Monique Clark as Aretha Johnson (sister of Alvin)
 Elimu Nelson as Dru Hilton
 Al Thompson as Ted
 Sam Sarpong as Kadeem
 Russell W. Howard as Anthony 
 Kenan Thompson as Walter
 Kal Penn as Kenneth Warman
 Kevin Christy as Chuck Mattock 
 Melissa Schuman as Zoe Parks (Paris' best friend)
 Nichole Galicia as Yvonne Freeman (Paris' another best friend)
 Reagan Gomez-Preston as Olivia
 Nicole Scherzinger as Champagne Girl
 Stuart Scott as Himself 
 Peter Siragusa as Ben 
 Imani Parks as Mia 
 Shani Pride as Jasmine 
 Gay Thomas Wilson as Judy Morgan (mother of Paris)
 Dante Basco as Spoken Word Artist 
 J.B. Guhman Jr. as JB 
 Ian Chidlaw as Eddie

Production
The school scenes were filmed at Long Beach Polytechnic High School in Long Beach, California. The film was shot in October 9, 2003.

Soundtrack

A soundtrack containing hip hop music was released on December 9, 2003 by Hollywood Records. It peaked at 22 on the Top R&B/Hip-Hop Albums and 14 on the Top Soundtracks. Allmusic rated this soundtrack three stars out of five.

 "Shorty (Put It on the Floor)"- 4:09 (Busta Rhymes, Chingy, Fat Joe and Nick Cannon)
 "Luv Me Baby"- 4:27 (Murphy Lee featuring Jazze Pha and Sleepy Brown)
 "Ignition (Remix)- 3:08 (R. Kelly)
 "Are You Ready"- 4:13 (Mr. Cheeks)
 "Got What It Takes"- 3:00 (Jeannie Ortega)
 "Pass the Courvoisier, Part II"- 4:11 (Busta Rhymes featuring P. Diddy and Pharrell Williams)
 "Exgirlfriend"- 4:02 (Nivea)
 "How Far Will You Go"- 3:45 (Ginuwine)
 "Comes to Light (Everything)"- 4:48 (Jill Scott)
 "Always"- 4:21 (Melissa Schuman)
 "Baby Girl"- 4:06 (Joe Budden)
 "I Wanna Kiss You"- 4:30 (Nicole Wray)
 "We Rise"- 4:04 (Rama Duke)
 "Hate 2 Luv U"- 3:29 (3LW)
 "She Is"- 3:33 (Hous'ton)
 "Spit da Flow"- 3:32 (Cash Take & B. Griffin)

Box office
The film opened at #4 at the American box office raking in $6,315,311 USD in its first opening weekend behind Stuck on You, The Last Samurai, and Something's Gotta Give.

Critical response

The film has received mostly negative reviews. On Rotten Tomatoes it has an approval rating of 13% based on reviews from 72 critics. The site's consensus: "A stale, unnecessary remake of Can't Buy Me Love." On Metacritic it has a score of 37% based on reviews from 23 critics.

Roger Ebert, film critic of the Chicago Sun-Times, gave the film a positive three-star rating after giving the original, Can't Buy Me Love, only half a star. Ebert describes the remake as wiser and less cynical than the original and suggests that it might have some insight into the insecurities of high school.

Awards and nominations
 
 2004 BET Comedy Awards
 Outstanding Directing for a Box Office Movie — Troy Beyer (nominated)

 2004 Teen Choice Awards
 Choice Breakout Movie Star, Female — Christina Milian (nominated)
 Choice Movie, Date Movie (nominated)
 Choice Movie Chemistry — Christina Milian, Nick Cannon (nominated)
 Choice Movie Liar — Nick Cannon (nominated)
 Choice Movie Liplock — Christina Milian, Nick Cannon (nominated)

References

External links
 
 
 
 

2003 films
2003 comedy films
2000s hip hop films
2000s teen sex comedy films
2000s teen romance films
African-American comedy films
Alcon Entertainment films
Remakes of American films
American teen comedy films
Films directed by Troy Beyer
Films scored by Richard Gibbs
Films shot in California
Warner Bros. films
2000s English-language films
2000s American films